In Canada, a penny (minted 1858–2012) is a coin worth one cent, or  of a dollar. According to the Royal Canadian Mint, the official national term for the coin is the "one-cent piece", but in practice the terms penny and cent predominate. Penny was likely readily adopted because the previous coinage in Canada (up to 1858) was the British monetary system, where Canada used British pounds, shillings, and pence as coinage alongside U.S. decimal coins and Spanish milled dollars.

In Canadian French, the penny is often known by the loanword cent; in contrast with the heteronymous word meaning "hundred", this keeps the English pronunciation .

Production of the penny ceased in May 2012, and the Royal Canadian Mint ceased distribution of them as of February 4, 2013. However, the coin remains legal tender. Nevertheless, once distribution of the coin ceased, vendors were no longer expected to return pennies as change for cash purchases and were encouraged to round purchases to the nearest five cents. Goods can still be priced in one-cent increments, with non-cash transactions like credit cards being paid to the exact cent.

Description
Like all Canadian coins, the obverse depicts the reigning Canadian monarch at the time of issue. The final obverse depicts Queen Elizabeth II; her likeness was introduced in 1953 and later saw three design updates, the first occurring in 1965, a 1990 update to the design of Dora de Pedery-Hunt, and the 2003 update designed by Susanna Blunt. A special reverse side, depicting a rock dove, was issued in 1967 as part of a centennial commemoration. It was designed by the Canadian artist Alex Colville, and its use in 1967 marked the only time the 1937 maple leaf design was not used for the penny before it was discontinued in 2012. The maple twig depicted on the coin is botanically incorrect as the phyllotaxis of the twig on the coin is clearly alternate, while maples always have opposite leaves.

Most pennies have a round, smooth edge. Pennies minted from 1982 to 1996 are twelve-sided. This was to help the visually impaired identify the coin. The 1997 copper-plated zinc coin proved difficult to plate in the twelve-sided shape, hence the mint reverted to a round shape.

History

These cents were originally issued to bring some kind of order to the Canadian monetary system, which, until 1858, relied on British coinage, bank and commercial tokens (francophones calling them , an historical term from the French currency), U.S. currency and Spanish milled dollars. The coin's specifications were chosen with the intention of the coins also being useful as measuring tools. However, their light weight compared to the bank and merchant halfpenny tokens readily available at the time was a serious hindrance to their acceptance by the public. Some of the coins were even sold at a 20% discount, and were inherited by the Dominion government in 1867. Fresh production of new cents (with the weight increased to ) was not required until 1876.

The large cents of 1858–1920 were significantly larger than modern one-cent coins and even slightly larger than the modern 25-cent piece (its diameter being ). After Confederation, these large cent coins were struck on the planchet of the British halfpenny and were roughly the same value. Pennies were issued sporadically in the third quarter of the 19th century. They were used in the Province of Canada, New Brunswick, and Nova Scotia upon Confederation in 1867. New Brunswick and Nova Scotia had issued their own coinage prior to that date, with British Columbia, Prince Edward Island, and Newfoundland continuing to issue "pennies" until they joined Confederation. The coin was reduced to its modern size in 1920, bringing it closer in size to the American penny.

1936 dot cent
The rare 1936 dot cent is as notable in Canadian numismatics as the 50-cent piece of 1921. There were four minted specimens of this coin, produced with the dot to show they were made in 1937 while the mint was waiting for new dies due to a delay caused by the abdication of King Edward VIII and the need to create new dies for his successor, George VI. The last one sold at Heritage Auctions in January 2010 for over  before taxes. It was graded specimen 66 by the Professional Coin Grading Service. Three known examples are in private collections, and the fourth is not in the Ottawa Currency Museum; it is one of few gaps in the museum's collection.

1947 Maple Leaf issue
In contrast to the 1936 issues, the 1948 cents dated 1947 and specially marked are very common. These 1947 Maple Leaf coins were made while the dies were being changed to show George VI was no longer Emperor of India, as the title of "Emperor of India" was dropped from the titles of the Crown per article 7.2 of the Parliament of the United Kingdom's Indian Independence Act 1947.

Composition throughout history

Based on technical specifications provided by the Mint Act, only pennies produced from 1982 to their discontinuation in 2013  are still legally "circulation coins".

From May 2006 to October 2008, all circulation Canadian pennies from 1942 to 1996 had a melt value of over  based on the increasing spot price of copper in the commodity markets. The break-even price for a 2.8 g solid copper penny is /lb., with prices during this period reaching as high as /lb.

Abolition

There had been repeated debate about ceasing production of the penny because of the cost of producing it and a perceived lack of usefulness. In mid-2010 the Standing Senate Committee on National Finance began a study on the future of the one-cent coin. On December 14, 2010, the Senate finance committee recommended the penny be removed from circulation, arguing that a century of inflation had eroded the value and usefulness of the one-cent piece. A 2007 survey indicated that 37 percent of Canadians used pennies, but the government continued to produce about 816million pennies per year, equal to 24 pennies per Canadian. The Royal Canadian Mint had been forced to produce large numbers of pennies because they disappeared from circulation, as people hoarded these coins or simply avoided using them. In 2011 the Royal Canadian Mint had minted 1.1billion pennies, more than doubling the 2010 production number of 486.2million pennies. In late 2010, finance committee members of the Canadian Senate estimated that the average Canadian had as many as 600 pennies hoarded away, taken out of circulation.

On March 29, 2012, the federal government announced in its budget that it would withdraw the penny from circulation in the fall of 2012. The budget announcement eliminating the penny cited the cost of producing it at 1.6 cents. The final penny was minted at the RCM's Winnipeg, Manitoba, plant on the morning of May 4, 2012, and was later entrusted to the Bank of Canada Museum in Ottawa.  Existing pennies will remain legal tender indefinitely;  however, pennies were withdrawn from circulation on February 4, 2013. The Currency Act says that "A payment in coins [...] is a legal tender for no more than [...] twenty-five cents if the denomination is one cent."

On February 4, 2013, the Mint began melting down the estimated 35billion pennies that were in circulation. On the same day, Google celebrated the beginning of the end for the Canadian penny with a Google Doodle.

Cash transactions are now rounded to the nearest multiple of 5 cents. The rounding is not done on individual items but on the total bill of sale, with totals being rounded to the nearest multiple of 5, i.e., totals ending in  round down to 0, totals ending in  round to 5, and totals ending in  round up to 10.

To honour the penny, the Royal Canadian Mint released several silver and gold coins and collectibles on their website, including a miniature gold coin, a gold-plated silver coin, a five-ounce silver coin, and a five-coin set of silver coins.

Commemorative editions

First strikes

Mintage

See also
 Dei Gratia Regina, which appears abbreviated on the face of the coin

References

External links

Value of Canadian Pennies
 Coinage Designs of 1967
All you need to know about Canada's penny withdrawal CBC News, March 30, 2012.

Coins of Canada
One-cent coins
1858 establishments in Canada
2012 disestablishments in Canada
Pennies